Roman Dolidze (born July 15, 1988) is a Georgian mixed martial artist currently competing in the Middleweight division for the Ultimate Fighting Championship (UFC). A professional competitor since 2016, Dolidze was the former World Warriors Fight Championship (WWFC) champion, ADCC Asia & Oceania champion, and Grappling FILA world champion. As of March 7, 2023, he is #9 in the UFC middleweight rankings.

Background
Dolidze was born on July 15, 1988, in Batumi, Georgian SSR, Soviet Union (now Georgia). Dolidze played soccer for eight years, the last three years of which spent as a professional goalkeeper. At the age of 20, he moved to Ukraine to study, and started training in sambo, Brazilian jiu-jitsu and eventually grappling. He went on to become the World Grappling Champion and the European Grappling Champion under United World Wrestling rules, as well as becoming the ADCC Asia & Oceania Champion at 99 kg (218 pounds) in 2016. This earned him a spot in the prestigious ADCC Worlds Tournament in 2017, however  he was defeated in the first round. At age of 28, he started to train in MMA.

Mixed martial arts career

Early career 
Dolidze made his MMA debut in 2016, where he was fighting out of Odessa, Ukraine. After winning his debut fight against Alexander Kovbel, Dolidze would go on to amass a 4-0 record in the Ukrainian circuit, before being given the chance to fight Eder de Souza for the vacant WWFC Light Heavyweight title. He beat de Souza by a second-round knockout. He was scheduled to defend his title against Michał Pasternak at WWFC 13. Dolidze beat Pasternak by a third-round knockout.

Ultimate Fighting Championship
Dolidze got signed to the UFC but before he made his debut, he tested positive for clomiphene and its metabolites M1 and M2, as well as a long-term metabolite of dehydrochlormethyltestosterone (DHCMT), 4-chloro-18-nor-17β-hydroxymethyl,17α-methyl-5α-androst-13-en-3α-ol (M3), as the result of an out-of-competition urine sample collected on March 12, 2019.  He was suspended for one year due to this violation and  he was eligible to fight in March 12, 2020.

On September 3, 2020, Dolidze along with Ryan Benoit, were granted temporary licenses following special hearings by the Nevada State Athletic Commission after they had recurring issues with the long-term metabolite of Turinabol pulsing in their system in trace amounts, long after ingestion. Both Benoit and Dolidze have already been suspended by United States Anti-Doping Agency (USADA), the UFC's anti-doping partner. Neither were facing a violation in Nevada, but the UFC wanted to get ahead of a potential issue. This was after USADA added a threshold for the presence of the M3 metabolite of DHCMT. If a test result is below 100 picograms per milliliter of the substance, it is no longer considered a violation, but an atypical finding, providing there is no evidence of new ingestion or performance-enhancing effects. Benoit and Dolidze were granted temporary licenses to compete beginning Dec. 1 following a six-month period of bimonthly testing by USADA.

A bout between Khadis Ibragimov and Roman Dolidze was initially scheduled for the promotion's inaugural event in Kazakhstan planned a month prior. However, the fight was postponed after the card was moved to Las Vegas due to travel restrictions for both participants related to the COVID-19 pandemic. The pairing was left intact and eventually took place on July 19, 2020 at UFC Fight Night: Figueiredo vs. Benavidez 2. Dolidze won the fight via technical knockout in round one after in process of high kick, Ibragimov tried to go for a takedown, during which Dolidze hit him with a knee, knocking Ibragimov out.
 
Dolidze faced John Allan at UFC on ESPN: Hermansson vs. Vettori on December 5, 2020. He won the bout via split decision; however 19 out of 19 media members scored it a 30-27 for Dolidze.

Dolidze, as a replacement for Dricus du Plessis, faced Trevin Giles in his middleweight debut on March 20, 2021 at UFC on ESPN 21 He lost the close bout via unanimous decision.

Dolidze was scheduled to face Alessio Di Chirico on June 5, 2021 at UFC Fight Night: Rozenstruik vs. Sakai. However, Di Chirico pulled out of the contest in mid-May due to an injury. Di Chirico was replaced by Laureano Staropoli. In a lackluster fight where Dolidze mostly held Staropoli in the clinch, he won the fight via unanimous decision.

Dolidze was scheduled to face Eryk Anders on November 13, 2021 at UFC Fight Night 197. However, Anders was pulled the event for undisclosed reasons, and he was replaced by Kyle Daukaus. In turn, the bout was scrapped due to COVID-19 protocols related to Dolidze’s camp.

Dolidze was scheduled to face Brendan Allen, replacing Brad Tavares on December 4, 2021 at UFC on ESPN 31. However, Dolidze was forced to pull from the bout due to complications in his recovery from COVID-19 and he was replaced by Chris Curtis.

Dolidze was rescheduled to face Kyle Daukaus  on June 18, 2022 at  UFC on ESPN 37. He won the bout via knockout in round one. This win earned him the Performance of the Night award.

Dolidze faced Phil Hawes on October 29, 2022, at UFC Fight Night 213. He won the fight via knockout in round one.

Dolidze, replacing undisclosed injury Derek Brunson, faced Jack Hermansson on December 3, 2022, at UFC on ESPN 42. He won the bout via ground and pound TKO in the second round.

Dolidze faced Marvin Vettori  on March 18, 2023 at UFC 286. He lost the fight via unanimous decision.

Championships and accomplishments

Mixed martial arts
World Warriors Fight Championship
 WWFC Light Heavyweight Championship 
One successful title defense
Ultimate Fighting Championship 
 Performance of the Night (Three times)

Grappling 
ADCC Asia & Oceania Champion
2016 ADCC Asia trials  (99 kg)
 Grappling World Champion FILA

Mixed martial arts record

|-
|Loss
|align=center|12–2
|Marvin Vettori
|Decision (unanimous)
|UFC 286
|
|align=center|3
|align=center|5:00
|London, England
|
|-
|Win
|align=center|12–1
|Jack Hermansson
|TKO (punches)
|UFC on ESPN: Thompson vs. Holland
|
|align=center|2
|align=center|4:06
|Orlando, Florida, United States
|
|-
|Win
|align=center|11–1
|Phil Hawes
|KO (punches)
|UFC Fight Night: Kattar vs. Allen
|
|align=center|1
|align=center|4:09
|Las Vegas, Nevada, United States
|
|-
|Win
|align=center|10–1
|Kyle Daukaus
|KO (knee and punches)
|UFC on ESPN: Kattar vs. Emmett
|
|align=center|1
|align=center|1:13
|Austin, Texas, United States
|
|-
|Win
|align=center|9–1
|Laureano Staropoli
|Decision (unanimous)
|UFC Fight Night: Rozenstruik vs. Sakai 
|
|align=center|3
|align=center|5:00
|Las Vegas, Nevada, United States
|
|-
|Loss
|align=center|8–1
|Trevin Giles
|Decision (unanimous)
|UFC on ESPN: Brunson vs. Holland
|
|align=center|3
|align=center|5:00
|Las Vegas, Nevada, United States
|
|-
|Win
|align=center|8–0
|John Allan
|Decision (split)
|UFC on ESPN: Hermansson vs. Vettori
|
|align=center|3
|align=center|5:00
|Las Vegas, Nevada, United States
|
|-
|Win
|align=center|7–0
|Khadis Ibragimov
|TKO (knee and punches) 
|UFC Fight Night: Figueiredo vs. Benavidez 2
|
|align=center|1
|align=center|4:15
|Abu Dhabi, United Arab Emirates
|
|-
|Win
|align=center|6–0
|Michał Pasternak
|KO (punch) 
|WWFC 13
|
|align=center|3
|align=center|3:00
|Kyiv, Ukraine
|
|-
|Win
|align=center|5–0
|Eder de Souza
|KO (punch) 
|WWFC 11
|
|align=center|2
|align=center|3:36
|Kyiv, Ukraine
|
|-
|Win
|align=center|4–0
|Amirali Zhoroev
|TKO (punches) 
|WWFC 9
|
|align=center|1
|align=center|3:34
|Kyiv, Ukraine
|
|-
|Win
|align=center|3–0
|Ilyas Abdulaev
|Submission (rear-naked choke) 
|WWFC 7
|
|align=center|1
|align=center|1:21
|Kyiv, Ukraine
|
|-
|Win
|align=center|2–0
|Rémi Delcampe
|Submission (heel hook) 
|WWFC: Cage Encounter 6
|
|align=center|1
|align=center|0:56
|Kyiv, Ukraine
|
|-
|Win
|align=center|1–0
|Alexander Kovbel
|Submission (heel hook) 
|RFP 53: West Fight 23
|
|align=center|1
|align=center|0:42
|Odessa, Ukraine
|

See also 
 List of current UFC fighters
 List of male mixed martial artists

References

External links 
  
 

1988 births
Living people
Male mixed martial artists from Georgia (country)
Sambo practitioners from Georgia (country)
Brazilian jiu-jitsu practitioners from Georgia (country)
Sportspeople from Batumi
Light heavyweight mixed martial artists
Mixed martial artists utilizing sambo
Mixed martial artists utilizing Brazilian jiu-jitsu
Ultimate Fighting Championship male fighters
Expatriate sportspeople from Georgia (country) in Ukraine